Society of Women Writers & Journalists (SWWJ) is a British learned society for professional women writers.

The society's aims include the "encouragement of literary achievement, the upholding of professional standards, and social contact with fellow writers and others in the field". It was founded as the Society of Women Journalists in 1894 by J. S. Wood, the editor of The Gentlewoman. Original members included Mary Frances Billington, Lady Colin Campbell, Mrs. Frank Leslie, Henrietta Stannard, Charlotte O'Conor Eccles, Marie Belloc, Madeline Greenwood, Lady Violet Grevile, and Mrs. Jack Johnson. Charlotte Humphry was the organisation's first president. The society adopted its current name in 1954.

The society began publishing a thrice yearly house magazine, Woman Journalist, in 1910. Its title was changed to Woman Writer in 2000.

Men who are published writers can now join the society as associate members.

References

External links
Official site
Society of Women Journalists 1894-1914

1894 establishments in the United Kingdom
Learned societies of the United Kingdom
Organizations for women writers